Robert James Shelby (born March 13, 1970) is an American attorney and judge serving as the Chief United States district judge of the United States District Court for the District of Utah.

Early life and education
Shelby was born in Fort Atkinson, Wisconsin. He served in the 19th Special Forces Group, 1457th Combat Engineer Battalion of the Utah Army National Guard from 1988 to 1996, and was on active duty during Operation Desert Storm in 1991. He received several military awards for his service, including the United States Army Achievement Medal for Desert Storm and the National Defense Service Medal. He received his Bachelor of Arts degree in 1994 from Utah State University and his Juris Doctor in 1998 from the University of Virginia School of Law.

Career

Early career 
In 1999, he served as a law clerk for District Judge J. Thomas Greene of the United States District Court for the District of Utah. He was an associate at Snow, Christensen & Martineau in Salt Lake City from 2000 to 2005. From 2005 to 2011, he was an associate at Burbridge, Mitchell & Gross. From 2011 to 2012, he again practiced at Snow, Christensen & Martineau as a shareholder. His practice focused on complex commercial litigation and catastrophic personal injury cases on behalf of both plaintiffs and defendants. Shelby served on the Salt Lake County Bar Association's Executive Committee since 2002, and as its vice chairman since 2011. He served on the Utah Supreme Court’s Advisory Committee on Rules of Civil Procedure and its Ethics and Discipline Committee. He lives in Salt Lake City with his wife, Angela, and their two children. He is a registered Republican.

Federal judicial service

On November 30, 2011, President Barack Obama nominated Shelby to be District Judge for the United States District Court for the District of Utah, replacing Judge Tena Campbell who took senior status on January 1, 2011. He received a hearing before the Senate Judiciary Committee on March 28, 2012, and his nomination was reported to the floor on April 26, 2012, by voice vote. Both Senators from Utah, Orrin Hatch and Mike Lee, endorsed his nomination, with Sen. Lee describing Shelby as "pre-eminently qualified" and predicting that he would be "an outstanding judge." Hatch highly lauded Shelby: "A man of keen intellect, Robert Shelby...has demonstrated an unwavering commitment to the law". In the early hours of September 22, 2012, on what was officially still the legislative day of September 21, the Senate confirmed Shelby in a voice vote. He received his commission on September 25, 2012. He became chief judge on October 1, 2018.

Notable decisions 

On December 20, 2013, Shelby struck down Amendment 3 of Utah’s State Constitution, which defined marriage as a union solely between a man and a woman, opening the way for same-sex marriage in the state. He found that Amendment 3 was in violation of the U.S. Constitution’s 14th Amendment, which guarantees due process and equal protection. This highly significant ruling set off a series of other district court decisions that overturned bans in several other states. His ruling was affirmed by the Tenth Circuit Court of Appeals on June 25, 2014. On October 6, 2014, the U.S. Supreme Court declined the review the Tenth Circuit's ruling, legalizing same-sex marriage in Utah.

References

External links

1970 births
Living people
21st-century American judges
Judges of the United States District Court for the District of Utah
People from Fort Atkinson, Wisconsin
United States district court judges appointed by Barack Obama
University of Utah faculty
University of Virginia School of Law alumni
Utah lawyers
Utah Republicans
Utah State University alumni